is the third single released by the Japanese techno-pop group Perfume, and the first single in which they were produced by Yasutaka Nakata. It appears as a track on the group's debut album, Perfume: Complete Best.

Since their 2005 major debut, the original single has been difficult to find and can be found on auction sites for more than double its original price. In February 2008, it was re-released and included in the "Fan Service -Prima Box-" CD+DVD boxset.

The cover of "Jenny wa Gokigen Naname" became one of Perfume's staple songs, being performed on many of their major tours.

CD track listing
 
 
 

Note: "Jenny wa Gokigen Naname" is a cover and was originally released by Juicy Fruits on June 1, 1980.

External links
 Music video on Clipland

2003 singles
Perfume (Japanese band) songs
2003 songs
Songs written by Yasutaka Nakata
Song recordings produced by Yasutaka Nakata